PNA Thompson (GC-26) is a Mantilla-class patrol boat of the Argentine Naval Prefecture, built at the Empresa Nacional Bazán shipyards and commissioned in 1983. The vessel is named after Martín Jacobo Thompson, an Argentine naval officer during the Independence War, and first Harbourmaster of Buenos Aires; she is the first PNA ship with this name.

Design 
Thompson is one of five Mantilla-class patrol boats ordered by the Argentine Naval Prefecture (PNA) in 1981, corresponding to the coast guard cutter “Halcon II” type, designed and build by the Spanish Empresa Nacional Bazán shipyard. The design is optimised for long range open seas patrols, for prolonged periods of time away from port.

Thompson has a steel hull and superstructure, with a single mast atop, behind the bridge. She is powered by two Bazán-MTU 16V-956-TB91 marine diesel engines of 2500 kW each (maximum intermittent power 3000 kW), driving two Variable-pitch propellers; with a maximum speed of 18kn (19kn at maximum intermittent power). The design has a maximum range of 3650 nautical miles at a cruise speed of 16kn.

She has 3 electrical generators of 185Kva each, powering a varied array of systems: controls and communications system that integrates with other PNA air and surface assets; navigation radar; echosound; direction finder; and helicopter navigation control.
Thompson is equipped with two water cannons for firefighting, anti-contamination gear, active stabilizers and a retractable hangar and landing pad with support facilities for an Alouette-sized helicopter. She is armed with a single 40mm L/70 Bofors dual-purpose autocannon in a position at the front of the bridge.

History 

Thompson was ordered by the Argentine Naval Prefecture (PNA) in 1981 as part of the five-ship Mantilla-class, composed by the patrol boats GC-24 to GC-28. She was built in 1981-83 by the Spanish Empresa Nacional Bazán shipyard. She was launched in December 1981, completed in June 1983, and left El Ferrol, Spain, on 18 August 1983, arriving in Buenos Aires later that month. She was commissioned on 26 August 1983 and assigned to the Coast Guard Service ( Servicio de Buques Guardacostas}).

In 1986 she was assigned to the “Prefectura de Mar del Plata” based in Mar del Plata.

As of 2016, she is based at Puerto Nuevo, part of the Port of Buenos Aires.

Footnotes

See also 
 Z-28 class patrol boat

References

Notes

Bibliography

Other sources

Further reading

External links 
  - Servicio de Buques Guardacostas – Prefectura Naval Argentina, oficial website (accessed 2016-11-26)

Mantilla-class patrol vessels
Patrol vessels of Argentina
Ships built in Spain
1983 ships